Age of Wanderer, also known as Yainsidae, is a beat 'em up game for PC, developed by Joymax.  The game is based on a k-drama by SBS of the same name.

Plot

Set during the Japanese military occupation of Korea, descendants of both nations were embroiled in a power struggle to control the streets of Jongro, the center of Korean trade. Gangsters harassed the local merchants, who joined forces with the Japanese to upset the balance and disturb the peace of the community.

Spurred into action, Doo Han Kim, leader of the Umi Gang and son of the famous General Jwah Jin Kim, and Sirasoni, a warrior of Manjoo descent and hailed as 'the greatest fighter of all time', rise up to challenge the oppressive tyranny. The resistance of the Japanese police, military police, and opposing gangs grew stronger, but Doo Han Kim and Sirasoni takes it to the streets to fight for the common people and restore peace to Jongro.

The mission of this fast-paced game is to defeat the Honmachi Clan, local thugs and gangsters.

External links
 Age of Wanderer at Joymax  
 Age of Wanderer at GameSpot (Korea)

2003 video games
Windows games
Windows-only games
Beat 'em ups
Video games developed in South Korea
Video games based on television series
South Korea-exclusive video games